Clark Backo is a Canadian actress. She is most noted for her recurring role as Rosie, Wayne's love interest, in the television series Letterkenny.

She has also appeared in the television series Remedy, Shoot the Messenger, 21 Thunder, Designated Survivor, Wynonna Earp, Supernatural and The Handmaid's Tale, and in the film Happy Place. She was an ACTRA Award nominee for Outstanding Performance (Female) at the ACTRA Toronto awards in 2021 for Happy Place.

In 2022, she co-starred in the Amazon feature film I Want You Back, alongside Charlie Day, Jenny Slate, Gina Rodriguez, Scott Eastwood and Manny Jacinto.

She is the daughter of musician Njacko Backo.

References

External links

21st-century Canadian actresses
Canadian film actresses
Canadian television actresses
Black Canadian actresses
Living people
Canadian people of Cameroonian descent
Year of birth missing (living people)